The third Minnesota Territorial Legislature first convened on January 7, 1852. The 9 members of the Minnesota Territorial Council and the 18 members of the Minnesota House of Representatives were elected during the General Election of October 14, 1851.

Sessions 
The territorial legislature met in a regular session from January 7, 1852 to March 6, 1852. There were no special sessions of the third territorial legislature.

Party summary

Council

House of Representatives

Leadership 
President of the Council
William Henry Forbes (D-Saint Paul)

Speaker of the House
John D. Ludden (D-Marine)

Members

Council

House of Representatives

Notes

References 

 Minnesota Legislators Past & Present - Session Search Results (Session 0.3, Senate)
 Minnesota Legislators Past & Present - Session Search Results (Session 0.3, House)

00.3rd
1850s in Minnesota Territory
1852 establishments in Minnesota Territory